András is a masculine given name and a surname of Hungarian origin.

People with the given name
 Andras (given name), a masculine given name

People with the surname
 Bob Andras (1921–1982), Canadian politician
 Joseph Andras (born 1984), French writer
 Emily Andras, Canadian television producer and writer

Other uses
 Andras (demon), a Great Marquis of Hell in the Ars Goetia
 Shani Andras, a fictional character in the anime Gundam SEED

See also
 Andras Baive, a Sámi fairy tale